National Archaeological Museum may refer to:

 National Archaeological Museum of Korçë, Albania
 National Archaeological Museum, Bulgaria
 National Archaeological Museum, France
 National Archaeological Museum, Athens, Greece
 National Archaeological Museum, Cagliari, Italy
 National Archaeological Museum, Florence, Italy
 National Archaeological Museum, Naples, Italy
 National Archaeological Museum, Madrid, Spain

See also 
 Museo Nazionale della Magna Grecia (National Archaeological Museum of Magna Græcia), Reggio Calabria, Italy
 National Museum of Archaeology (disambiguation), includes uses of "National Archaeology Museum"